The Cannibals are a British rock band formed in 1976 by Mike Spenser, formerly of The Count Bishops, after his new band, the Flying Tigers, had split up. They have released seven full-length albums, numerous singles, EP's, split LP's, and appeared on several compilations. The band perform Trash rock and garage punk.

Line-up

Current members
Mike Spenser - Vocals, Harmonica
Patrice Picard - Vox Phantom VI 
Clive Leach - Bass 
Richard Jones - Furry Drums

Former members
Ben Donnely (of The Inmates)
Peter Gunn (of The Inmates)
Tony Oliver (of The Inmates
Dino Coccia (Drummer) on "Nothing Takes The Place Of You" & "Crystal Blue" 
Adam Blake (of Treatment)
Virgil Tracy
Johnny Walker
Johnny "Mother" Johnson (of Thee Headcoats)
Marco Valentino (Drums)
Mike McCann
Geff Mead (Bass - Guitar)
Laury Picard (of Drunk Sincerity)
Mark Wiffen (of Anti State Control)
Sebastien Marks
Dave Heard
Barry Frost
John Roland (Thee Headcoats)
Patrice Llaberia
Dave Good
Doug "Kes" Forrester
Clive Leach (Treatment)
Richard Jones (drums) (Intestines, TV Slaves, BIRTHMARK)
Chris Dalley (of Sundial)
Jeremy Rice
Mike Berry (The Intellektuals)
Johnny Buck (The Polecats)
Chris Dust
Tim Arrowsmith
Andy Cooper (The Leeches)
John Moore (The Jesus and Mary Chain)
Gary (Drummer, Friend of Dave Heard)
Ben York-Barber (drummer)
Tim Powell (RIP) Guitarist on Pills
Eric Baconstrip (drummer, of King Salami & the Cumberland 3)
Kamikaze U.T. Vincent (bass, of King Salami & the Cumberland 3)
Gordon Russell (Dr. Feelgood)
Steve Lewins (Count Bishops, Solid Senders)
Kenny Harris (Motor Boys Motor, Screaming Blue Messiahs)
Tim Brocket (The Commuters)
Pierre (Bass)
Fritz (German - Drums)
Clive (Guitar)
Oliver Katz-Debarge (Guitar)
John (Tex Avery)
Eric Baconstrip (King Salami and the Cumberland 3)
UT Kamakazi (King Samlami and the Cumberland 3)
Patrice Picard (Guitar)
Jay Wiffen (R.I.P.) - Guitars
Peter Revez - Bass
Max Demata (Bass)
Gene Crazed (Guitar)
Paul Hutchinson (Bass) 
Jerry Nolan (New York Dolls, Heartbreakers - one gig Upstairs at Ronnie Scott's with the Cannibals)
Tony Rathskeller (Drums. Thee Rathskellers - The Psychomotor Pluck - The Fainas - Zero - The Rumble Fish - The Fish Revenge - Trash Experience)
Mike Spenser (Vocals and mouth organ and some really not terrible guitar)

Discography

Albums
... Bone to Pick (1982)
Trash for Cash (1985) USA only
Hot Stuff (1985)
The Rest of ... The Cannibals (1985)
Please Do Not Feed ... The Cannibals (1986)
And the Lord Said ... Let There Be Trash (1991)
Brunch with ... The Cannibals (2008)

Compilation albums
The Brest of ... The Cannibals (1995)
Brunch With...The Cannibals (2008) CD for Japan Tour
Trash From Europe (2015)

Split albums
Run, Chicken, Run (Volume 1) (with The Surfadelics) (1987)

EPs and singles   
"Good Guys" (under the name 'Mike Spenser and The Cannibals', No. 64 in John Peel's Record Box), Big Cock (1977)
"Nadine b/w "You Can't", "Sweet Little 16", Hit, (1978 ) 
"Pick 'N' Choose" b/w "I Could See Right through You", Hit (1981)
Trash Flash! (1982)
"Led Astray", Hit (1982)
"The Submarine Song" b/w "Paralytic Confusion", Hit (1984)
"Christmas Rock 'N' Roll" (1985), Hit
"Kings of Trash" (under the name 'Five Young Cannibals') (1987)
"You Drive Me Mental" b/w "Paralytic Confusion", Hit (under the name 'Five Young Cannibals') (1989)

Split singles
"Are You Going to Stonehenge" (with Stoned Aid) (1989)
"Axe the Tax" (with The Voice Of The People) (1990)

Various artists compilation albums
The London R & B Sessions (1980)
These Cats Ain't Nothin' But Trash (with The Milkshakes and The Sting-rays) (1983)
Twenty Great Hits of The 60's (1984)
Garage Goodies, Volume 1 (1986)
Meltdown On Media Burn (1986)
Garage Kings (& Junkyard Angels) (1988)
All Night Garage Service (1991)
The Songs the Cramps Taught Us (1992)
The Trash Box (2004)

References

External links
Official MySpace

Garage punk groups
British garage rock groups
English punk rock groups
Musical groups established in 1976
Homestead Records artists